is a Japanese Professional baseball pitcher for the Fukuoka SoftBank Hawks of Nippon Professional Baseball.

Early baseball career
Otake participated in the 2nd grade summer 94th Japanese High School Baseball Championship and the 3rd grade spring 85th Japanese High School Baseball Invitational Tournament as an ace pitcher at Seisei High School. He went to Waseda University and won the Best Nine in the Tokyo Big6 Baseball League.

Professional career
On October 26, 2017, Otake was not drafted as a registered player under control in the 2017 Nippon Professional Baseball draft, but drafted as a developmental player by the Fukuoka Softbank Hawks.

On July 29, 2018, he signed a 6 million yen contract with the Fukuoka SoftBank Hawks as a registered player under control. On August 1, Otake debuted against the Saitama Seibu Lions and won the game for the first time. In 2018 season, he finished the regular season with a 3–2 Win–loss record, a 3.88 ERA, a 36 strikeouts in 48 2/3 innings. And he pitched in the 2018 Japan Series.

In 2019 season, Otake finished the regular season with a 5–4 Win–loss record, a 3.82 ERA, a 72 strikeouts in 106 innings. And he was selected as the Japan Series roster in the 2019 Japan Series.

In 2020 season, Otake delayed his first pitch in the Pacific League to August 13 due to rehabilitation of his left elbow injury. He recorded with a 3 Games pitched, a 2–0 Win–loss record, a 2.30 ERA, a 8 strikeouts in 15.2 innings. And he recorded with a 16 Games pitched, a 6–3 Win–loss record, a.667 Winning percentage, a 2.53 ERA, a 73 strikeouts in 92.1 innings in the Western League of NPB's minor leagues, 
was honored for the Western League Wins Leader Award, the Western League ERA Leader Award, the Western League Winning percentage Leader Award, and the Western League Excellent Pitcher Award at the NPB AWARD 2020. In the 2020 Japan Series against the Yomiuri Giants, he was selected as the Japan Series roster.

In 2021 season, Otake finished the regular season with 2 Games pitched, a 0–1 Win–loss record, a 15.75 ERA, a one strikeouts in 4 innings.

In 2022 season, he finished the regular season with 2 Games pitched, a 0–2 Win–loss record, a 6.43 ERA, a 5 strikeouts in 7 innings.

References

External links

NPB.jp
10 Koutaro Ohtake PLAYERS2022 - Fukuoka SoftBank Hawks Official site

1995 births
Living people
Fukuoka SoftBank Hawks players
Japanese baseball players
Nippon Professional Baseball pitchers
Waseda University alumni
Baseball people from Kumamoto Prefecture